This is a list of the works of fiction which have won the Spur Award for Best Short Fiction:
 1953 - Short Story: "Gun Job" by Thomas Thompson
 1954 - Short Story: "Blood on the Sun" by Thomas Thompson
 1955 - Short Story: "Bad Company" by S. Omar Barker
 1956 - Short Story: "Lost Sister" by Dorothy M. Johnson
 1957 - Short Story: "The Brushoff' by Peggy Simson Curry
 1958 - Short Story: "Thief in Camp" by Bill Gulick
 1959 - Short Story: "Grandfather Out of the Past" by Noel Loomis
 1960 - Short Story: "The Shaming of Broken Horn" by Bill Gulick
 1961 - Short Story: `A Town Named Hate" by John Prebble
 1962 - Short Story: "Isley's Stranger" by Will Henry
 1963 - Short Story: "Comanche Woman" by Fred Grove
 1964 - Short Story: "Log Studio of C.M. Russell" by Lola Shelton
 1965 - Short Material: "Tallest Indian in Toltepec" by Will Henry
 1966 - Short Material: "Empty Saddles at Christmas" by S. Omar Barker
 1967 - Short Material: "The Guns of William Longley" by Donald Hamilton
 1968 - Short Material: "When the Caballos Came" by Fred Grove
 1969 - Short Subject: "Westward to Blood and Glory" by Cliff Farrell
 1970 - Short Subject: "In the Silence" by Peggy Simson Curry
 1971 - Short Subject: "Shootout in Burke Canyon" by Earl Clark
 1972 - Short Subject: "Call of the Cow Country?' by Harry F. Webb
 1973 - Short Subject: "The Comancheros" by John Harrell
 1974 - Short Subject: (tie) "The Other Nevadan" by Robert Laxalt and "Buried Money" by Eve Ball
 1975 - Short Subject: "Apaches in the History of the Southwest" by Donald Worcester
 1976 - Short Subject: "Jonathan Gilliam & The White Man's Burden" by C. L. Sonnichsen
 1977 - Short Subject: "Where the Cowboys Hunkered Down" by John L. Sinclair
 1978 - Short Subject: `A Season for Heroes" by Carla Kelly
 1979 - Short Subject: "Jason Glendauer's Watch" by James Bellah
 1980 - Short Subject: "One Man's Code" by Wayne Barton
 1981 - Short Subject (Fiction): "Kathleen Flaherty's Long Winter" by Carla Kelly
 1982 - Short Subject (Fiction): "Horseman" by Oakley Hall
 1983 - Short Subject (Fiction): "The Ten Sleep Mail" by William F. Bragg, Jr.
 1984 - Short Subject (Fiction): "Sale of One Small Ranch" by Paul St. Pierre
 1985 - Short Fiction: "The Way It Was Told to Me" by Bill Brett
 1986 - Short Fiction: "The Bandit" by Loren D. Estleman
 1987 - Short Fiction: "The Orange County Cowboys" by Max Evans
 1988 - Short Fiction: "Yellow Bird: An Imaginary Autobiography" by Robert J. Conley
 1989 - Short Fiction: "The Indian Summer of Nancy Redwing" by Harry W Paige
 1990 - Short Fiction: "Just As I Am" by Joyce Gibson Roach
 1991 - Short Fiction: "Cimarron, The Killer" by Benjamin Capps
 1992 - Short Fiction: "The Face" by Ed Gorman
 1993 - Short Fiction: "Lou" by Jane Candia Coleman
 1994 - Short Fiction: "Charity" by Sandra Whiting
 1995 - Short Fiction: `Are You Coming Back, Phin Montana?" by Jane Candia Coleman
 1996 - Short Fiction: "The Alchemist" by Loren D. Estleman
 1997 - In this year the WWA Executive Board voted to redesignate the Spur Awards to reflect the year the award is presented rather than the year the work was published.
 1998 - Short Fiction: "Sue Ellen Learns to Dance" by Judy Alter
 1999 - Short Fiction: "Secrets of the Lost Cannon" by Allen P. Bristow
 2000 - Short Fiction: "Opening Day" by David Marion Wilkinson
 2001 - Best Western Short Fiction: “All or Nothing” by Gary Svee
 2002 - Short Fiction: "A Piano at Dead Man's Crossing" by Johnny D. Boggs
 2003 - Best Western Short Fiction: "The Old Man" by Jimbo Brewer
 2004 - Short Fiction: "Second Coming" by Andrew Geyer
 2005 - Short Fiction: "The Promotion" by Larry D. Sweazy
 2006 - Short Fiction: "Pecker's Revenge" by Lori Van Pelt
 2007 - Best Western Short Fiction: "Comanche Moon" by Dusty Richards
 2008 - Best Western Short Fiction Story: "Crucifixion River" by Marcia Muller and Bill Pronzini
 2009 - Best Western Short Fiction Story: “Cornflower Blue” by Susan K. Salzer
 2010 - Best Western Short Fiction Story:“At the End of the Orchard” by John D. Nesbitt
 2011 - Best Western Short Fiction Story:“Bonnie and Clyde in the Backyard” by K.L. Cook
 2012 - Best Western Short Fiction Story:(tie) “The Death of Delgado” by Rod Miller and “The Deacon’s Horse” by Clay Reynolds

External links
 Spur Award - Western Writers of America

American literary awards
Literature lists
American literature-related lists